Lamari Rural LLG is a local-level government (LLG) of Eastern Highlands Province, Papua New Guinea.

Wards
01. Motokara
02. Kobara
03. Atagara
04. Numbaira
05. Bibeori
06. Baira No. 2
07. Baira No. 1
08. Mei'auna
09. Ogurataba
10. Bi'api'arata
11. Bakumpa
12. Kawaina No. 1
13. Kumbora
14. Saurona
15. Obura Gov't Station
16. Kurunumbura
17. Yunura
18. Asara
19. Himarata
20. Anima
21. Tunana
22. Ahea
23. Habi ina
24. Oraura No. 1
25. Kokombira
26. Pinata
27. Owena
28. Tainoraba
29. Mobutasa
30. Agamusi

References

Local-level governments of Eastern Highlands Province